Chrysobothris costifrons is a species of metallic wood-boring beetle in the family Buprestidae. It is found in Central America and North America.

Subspecies
These three subspecies belong to the species Chrysobothris costifrons:
 Chrysobothris costifrons baja Westcott, 1983
 Chrysobothris costifrons costifrons Waterhouse, 1887
 Chrysobothris costifrons rubiterga Westcott, 1983

References

Further reading

 
 
 

Buprestidae
Articles created by Qbugbot
Beetles described in 1887